King George VI received numerous decorations and honorary appointments, both during and before his time as monarch of the United Kingdom and the dominions. Of those listed below; where two dates are shown, the first indicates the date of receiving the award or title, and the second indicates the date of its loss or renunciation.

Titles, styles, and honours

Titles and styles
George VI was from birth a Prince of the United Kingdom, and was subsequently created a royal duke. It was as a duke that he succeeded his brother, King Edward VIII, to the throne.

 14 December 189528 May 1898: His Highness Prince Albert of York
 28 May 189822 January 1901: His Royal Highness Prince Albert of York
 22 January 19019 November 1901: His Royal Highness Prince Albert of Cornwall and York
 9 November 19016 May 1910: His Royal Highness Prince Albert of Wales
 6 May 19103 June 1920: His Royal Highness The Prince Albert
 3 June 192011 December 1936: His Royal Highness The Duke of York
Subsidiary titles: Earl of Inverness and Baron Killarney
 11 December 19366 February 1952: His Majesty The King

Titles vested in the Crown
Certain titles are borne and held by the reigning sovereign.

 Isle of Man
11 December 19366 February 1952: His Majesty The King, Lord of Mann

 Church of England
11 December 19366 February 1952: Defender of the Faith and Supreme Governor of the Church of England

Other titles traditionally attributed to the reigning sovereign are Duke of Lancaster, to reflect that the Duchy of Lancaster is a private estate of the sovereign, and Duke of Normandy in the sovereign's capacity as head of state of the Bailiwicks of Jersey and Guernsey.

Titles held personally
George VI has held certain titles in a personal capacity, either by virtue of birth, or otherwise.

 House of Saxe-Coburg and Gotha
14 December 1895 – 17 July 1917: Prince of Saxe-Coburg and Gotha, Duke of Saxony

 Commonwealth of Nations
28 April 19496 February 1952: Head of the Commonwealth

Title in the dominions and India

The Dominions were self-governing entities which had the as their respective head of state the same person as was the British sovereign. These Dominions typically used the style and title of the sovereign as proclaimed in the United Kingdom, which, from the reign of Edward VII came to include the phrase, “and of the British Dominions beyond the Seas”, signifying their reign over said Dominions. However, the sovereign reigned in these Dominions in a capacity independent from their position as monarch of the United Kingdom, similar in meaning and usage to, but not the same as modern-day Commonwealth realms, in that they lacked a separate title for each Dominion, until the reign of Elizabeth II. George VI's reign in the Dominions does not completely match his reign in the United Kingdom and his role as monarch in the Irish Free State is debated.

Per the terms of the Indian Independence Act, the imperial title was to be abolished. However, George VI issued a royal proclamation for that purpose and to that effect only on 22 June 1948, effectively reigning as king in the newly created Dominions of India and Pakistan whilst still bearing the imperial title for himself and his consort.

The title of Kaisar-i-Hind was coined in 1876 by the orientalist G. W. Leitner as the imperial title for the sovereign and was also employed in an official capacity, most notably to denote Crown property in India. This title continues to persist as a placeholder to the modern day in official records dating to the British era, despite the prohibition and deprecation of the use of the said title and all its variants for any and all purposes. Its usage is to be so understood as to denote the Government of India per the relevant provisions of the Government Grants Act, read alongside and in the context of the Transfer of Property Act and the Repealing and Amending (Second) Act.

Heraldry 

As Duke of York, George VI bore the royal arms of the United Kingdom differenced with a label of three points argent, the centre point bearing an anchor azure—a difference earlier awarded to his father, George V, when he was Duke of York, and then later awarded to his grandson Prince Andrew, Duke of York. As king, he bore the royal arms undifferenced and as king of India, his heraldic badge was an imperial crown upon the Ashoka Chakra.

Military ranks 

 United Kingdom
 15 May 19161918: Sub-Lieutenant, Royal Navy
 29 December 19181919:Temporary Captain and Staff Officer (3rd Class, Air), Royal Air Force
 3 June 1919: Personal Aide-de-Camp to the King
 1 August1 November 1919: Flight Lieutenant, Royal Air Force
 1 November 19191 June 1920: Squadron Leader, Royal Air Force
 31 December 19201925: Commander, Royal Navy
 1 June 192030 June 1921: Wing Commander, Royal Air Force
 30 June 19213 June 1932: Group Captain, Royal Air Force
 3 June 19321 January 1936: Rear-Admiral, Royal Navy
 3 June 19321 January 1936: Major-General, British Army
 3 June 19321 January 1936: Air Vice-Marshal, Royal Air Force
 1 January21 January 1936: Vice-Admiral, Royal Navy
1 January21 January 1936: Lieutenant-General, British Army
 1 January21 January 1936: Air Marshal, Royal Air Force
 21 January11 December 1936: Admiral, Royal Navy
 21 January11 December 1936: General, British Army
 11 December 19366 February 1952: Admiral of the Fleet, Royal Navy
 11 December 19366 February 1952: Marshal of the Royal Air Force
 11 December 19366 February 1952: Field Marshal, British Army

 Australia
 2 June 19386 February 1952: Admiral of the Fleet, Royal Australian Navy
 2 June 19386 February 1952: Marshal of the Royal Australian Air Force
 2 June 19386 February 1952: Field Marshal, Australian Army

Foreign honours 

Appointments

Freedom of the City

Commonwealth realms
  28 October 1919: London.
  1924: Derry.
  26 October 1926: Glasgow.
  29 August 1928: Stirling.
  1929: Ilford.
  10 August 1935: Perth.

Honorific eponyms

A number of geographical features, roads, and institutions are named after George VI. These include King George Hospital in London; King George VI Reservoir in Surrey, United Kingdom; King George Highway and King George Boulevard in Surrey, British Columbia; Kingsway in Edmonton; George VI Sound in Antarctica; and the King George VI Chase, a horse race in the United Kingdom.

See also
 Style of the British Sovereign
 Title and style of the Canadian monarch
 List of titles and honours of Elizabeth II
 List of titles and honours of Prince Philip, Duke of Edinburgh
 List of titles and honours of King Charles III
 List of titles and honours of Queen Camilla
 List of titles and honours of William, Prince of Wales
 List of titles and honours of Anne, Princess Royal
 List of titles and honours of Queen Elizabeth The Queen Mother
 List of titles and honours of Mary of Teck
 List of titles and honours of Prince Arthur, Duke of Connaught and Strathearn

Notes

References

George VI
George VI
George VI
George VI
George VI
George VI
Commonwealth royal styles